Sir Reginald William Colin Swartz KBE (14 April 1911 – 2 February 2006) was an Australian Liberal Party politician who was Minister during the governments of Sir Robert Menzies, Harold Holt and John Gorton.  In particular, he is best known as the Minister for Civil Aviation between 1966 and 1969.

He represented the Division of Darling Downs in the House of Representatives between 1949 and 1972 and was a member of the Government for the entire length of his parliamentary service.

Swartz Barracks at the Oakey Army Aviation Centre is named for him.

Early life
Swartz was born in Brisbane in 1911 and attended Toowoomba Grammar School. He joined the 2nd AIF during World War II. Swartz was a member of the 2/26th Infantry Battalion of the Australian 8th Division in the Battle of Malaya. After capture by the Japanese, he was a prisoner of war in Changi prison and worked on the Burma–Thailand Railway. He was appointed a Member of the Order of the British Empire for his war service.

In 1988, he accompanied John Howard along with two other parliamentarians who were former POWs, John Carrick and Tom Uren, to the opening of the Hellfire Pass Memorial Museum, commemorating the 2700 Australians who died working on the Burma-Thailand Railway.

Parliamentary career

Swartz was elected as the Liberal member for Darling Downs in 1949. As such, he was a "Forty-niner" which was the name for the Liberal and Country Party members first elected in the landslide victory by the Coalition in that year.

Menzies appointed Swartz as Parliamentary Secretary for Trade in 1956. In that position, he led Trade Missions to India in 1956 and South East Asia in 1958. He was appointed as Minister for Repatriation in 1961 and served in that position before becoming Minister for Health from 1964 to 1966 and briefly Minister for Social Services in early 1965.

Harold Holt appointed Swartz as Minister for Civil Aviation in 1966 and he served in that Ministry for three years. John Gorton appointed him as Minister for National Development in 1969 and he served in that position for three years. He was Leader of the House responsible for managing Government business in the House of Representatives from 1971 to 1972.

Swartz was knighted in 1972 and retired as a parliamentarian later that year.

References
 "Former Menzies Minister dies", Herald Sun Victoria, 3 February 2006
 National Library of Australia, Papers of Sir Reginald Swartz
 Media release by John Howard on death of Reginald Swartz

External links
 Articles on Sir Reginald Swartz are also on the Australian Army Aviation Association's website

1911 births
2006 deaths
World War II prisoners of war held by Japan
Liberal Party of Australia members of the Parliament of Australia
Members of the Australian House of Representatives for Darling Downs
Members of the Australian House of Representatives
Leaders of the Australian House of Representatives
Members of the Cabinet of Australia
Australian prisoners of war
Australian Knights Commander of the Order of the British Empire
Australian politicians awarded knighthoods
Australian people of German descent
Burma Railway prisoners
20th-century Australian politicians
People educated at Toowoomba Grammar School
Australian Ministers for Health